Leandro Izaguirre (February 13, 1867 in Mexico City – February 26, 1941 in Mexico City) was a Mexican painter, illustrator and teacher. He entered the Academia de San Carlos in Mexico City in 1884. He is perhaps best known for his Torture of Cuauhtémoc (1892) which he would demonstrate a year later in Philadelphia and win an award for. The realist painting depicts the last Aztec emperor Cuauhtémoc.

For some years Izaguirre was a professor at the Academia, and had work commissioned in Europe (1904-6). He also worked as an illustrator for the magazine Mundo ilustrado.

References
Art Encyclopedia (2002).  The Concise Grove Dictionary of Art. Oxford University Press, Inc.

19th-century Mexican painters
Mexican male painters
20th-century Mexican painters
Mexican illustrators
1867 births
1941 deaths
People from Mexico City
19th-century Mexican male artists
20th-century Mexican male artists